Steen Lerche Olsen (17 June 1886 – 5 May 1960) was a Danish gymnast who competed in the 1912 Summer Olympics and in the 1920 Summer Olympics.

He was part of the Danish team, which was able to win the bronze medal in the gymnastics men's team, free system event in 1912. Eight years later he won a gold medal in the gymnastics men's team, free system event.

References

1886 births
1960 deaths
Danish male artistic gymnasts
Gymnasts at the 1912 Summer Olympics
Gymnasts at the 1920 Summer Olympics
Olympic gymnasts of Denmark
Olympic gold medalists for Denmark
Olympic bronze medalists for Denmark
Olympic medalists in gymnastics
Medalists at the 1920 Summer Olympics
Medalists at the 1912 Summer Olympics